is a former Japanese football player.

Playing career
Kanazawa was born in Iruma on July 9, 1976. After graduating from Kokushikan University, he joined J1 League club Júbilo Iwata in 1999. Although he could not become a regular player, he played many matches as left side midfielder from first season. The club won the champions 1999 and 2002 J1 League. In Asia, the club won the champions 1998–99 Asian Club Championship and the 2nd place 1999–00 and 2000–01 Asian Club Championship. In 2003, he moved to FC Tokyo. He became a regular player as left side back from first season. The club won the champions 2004 J.League Cup. Although he could hardly play in the match for injury in 2006, he came back and became a regular player again in 2007. From 2008, he lost regular position behind newcomer Yuto Nagatomo and he also played as defensive midfielder not only left side back. In August 2009, he moved to Júbilo Iwata for the first time in 7 years. He played as regular left side back in 2009 season. Although he could not play many matches from 2010, the club won the champions 2010 J.League Cup. His opportunity to play decreased from 2011 and he moved to J2 League club Thespakusatsu Gunma in 2014. He retired end of 2014 season at the age of 38.

Club statistics

References

External links

1976 births
Living people
Kokushikan University alumni
Association football people from Saitama Prefecture
Japanese footballers
J1 League players
J2 League players
Júbilo Iwata players
FC Tokyo players
Thespakusatsu Gunma players
Association football defenders